Sandhya Roy is an Indian actress and politician. She is known for her work in Bengali cinema. She is the recipient of BFJA Award for three times, and one Filmfare Awards East best actress for Ganadevata.

Roy made her cinematic debut with Rajen Tarafdar's Antariksha (1957).

Political career
In 2014, she contested a seat in the Lok Sabha election for the All India Trinamool Congress and won the 2014 Lok Sabha elections from Medinipur constituency and became a member of the Parliament of India.

Filmography

 Ganga (1960)
 Maya Mriga (1960)
 Kathin Maya (1961)
 Arghya a.k.a. Offering to the Gods (1961)
 Subha Dristi a.k.a. Holy Meeting of Eyes (1962)
 Rakta Palash (1962)
 Nav Diganta a.k.a. New Horizon (1962)
 Dhoop Chhaya a.k.a. Sunlight and Shade (1962)
 Bandhan (1962)
 Asli-Naqli (1962)
 Palatak (1963)
 Bhrantibilas (1963)
 Pooja Ke Phool (1964)
 Surya Tapa a.k.a. Blessed by the Sun (1965)
 Ek Tuku Basa (1965)
 Antaral a.k.a. Distance (1965)
 Alor Pipasa (1965)
 Monihar (1966)
 Natun Jiban (1966)
 Prastar Swakshar (1967)
 Tin Adhyay (1968)
 Baghini (1968)
 Rahgir (1969)
 Dadu (1969)
 Aparachita (1969)
 Arogya Niketan (1969)
 Rupasi  (1970)
 Nimantran (1971)
 Jaane-Anjaane (1971)
 Kuheli (1971)
 Chithi (1973)
 Sriman Prithviraj (1973)
 Ami Sirajer Begam (1973)
 Ashani Sanket a.k.a. Distant Thunder (1973)
 Thagini (1974)
 Jiban Kahini (1974)
 Fuleswari (1974)
 Sansar Seemantey (1975)
 Palanka (1975)
 Baba Taraknath (1977)
 Kabita (1977)
 Ke Tumi (1978)
 Dhanraj Tamang (1978)
 Ganadevata (1979)
 Nagpash (1980)
 Dadar Kirti (1980)
 Shahar Theke Dooray (1981)
 Meghmukti (1981)
 Khana Baraha (1981)
 Khelar Putul (1981)
 Amar Geeti (1983)
 Agradani (1983)
 Pathbhola (1986)
 Path-o-Prasad (1991)
 Nabab (1991)
 Satya Mithya (1992)
 Debipaksha (2004)
 Nabab Nandini (2007)
 Maa Amar Maa (2009)
 Choto Bou (1988)

Awards
 Won- "Banga Bibhushan",the highest civilian award in West Bengal for her contribution to Indian Cinema in 2013.
 BFJA Award - Best Supporting Actress Award for Tin Adhay in 1969.
 BFJA Award - Best Actress Award for Nimantran in 1972.
 BFJA Award - Best Actress Award for Sansar Simante in 1976.
 Filmfare Awards East - Best Actress Award for Ganadevata in 1979.
 Bharatnirman Award in 1997.
 Kalakar Awards - Lifetime Achievement Award in 2005.

References

External links

Official biographical sketch in Parliament of India website

Actresses from Kolkata
Indian film actresses
Living people
Bengali Hindus
Actresses in Bengali cinema
20th-century Indian actresses
India MPs 2014–2019
Women in West Bengal politics
Lok Sabha members from West Bengal
Indian actor-politicians
21st-century Indian women politicians
21st-century Indian politicians
Trinamool Congress politicians from West Bengal
People from Paschim Medinipur district
1941 births